Latu is an Austronesian language spoken on Seram Island in the Moluccas in eastern Indonesia. It is linguistically close to Saparua.

References

Central Maluku languages
Languages of Indonesia
Seram Island